The ardin is a type of harp played in Mauritania. It has a resonating body made of calabash, with 10 to 16 strings, and is played by female griots.

References

Harps
Mauritanian musical instruments